Primula specuicola (common names - cavedwelling primrose, cave primrose, Easter flower) is perennial plant in the primrose family (Primulaceae) found in the Colorado Plateau and Canyonlands region of the southwestern United States.

Description

Growth pattern

Leaves and stems
 leaves are green on top and whitish underneath, spatula shaped (spatulate) to elliptical, and sometimes toothed at the margins.

Inflorescence and fruit
It is one of the earliest bloomers in its habitat, blooming from February to June. "Primula" means first, referring to the early bloom time of the genus. The inflorescence is a cluster of flowers at the end of a leafless stalk. The flowers are lavender to pink, have a corolla tube with a yellow ring at the mouth, and then flare into five lobes, with two lobes at the end of each of the 5.

Habitat and range
It only grows in the Colorado Plateau (endemic) near seeps and hanging gardens.

References

specuicola
Flora of the Southwestern United States
Flora of the Western United States
Flora without expected TNC conservation status